Huna (Hawaiian for "secret") is the word adopted by Max Freedom Long (1890–1971) in 1936 to describe his theory of metaphysics. Long cited what he believed to be the spiritual practices of the ancient Hawaiian kahunas (priests) as inspiration; however, contemporary scholars consider the system to be his invention designed through a mixture of a variety of spiritual practices from various cultures, with roots in New Thought and Theosophy, rather than in traditional Hawaiian beliefs. Huna is part of a New Age [non-Hawaiian] movement.

History
Max Freedom Long, who was not Hawaiian, went to Hawaii in 1917 to work as an elementary school teacher. He became interested in the religious beliefs and practices of the ancient kahunas and modern practitioners of traditional, indigenous Hawaiian religion, but none of the ceremonial people talked to him so he was unable to penetrate to the inner workings of this religion. He left Hawaii in 1931, convinced that he would never learn these secrets. In 1934, he woke with a revelation that the secrets were encoded into the Hawaiian language itself. He called the religious system he developed from this revelation 'Huna' (the Hawaiian word for secret), and wrote his first book in 1936 to chronicle his beliefs. There are no accepted Hawaiian sources that refer to the word 'Huna' as a tradition of esoteric learning.

In 1945 Long founded Huna Research. In 1953, he published The Secret Science at Work as a Huna textbook, and in 1965 The Huna Codes in Religions, examining parallels between his invented system and religions such as Hinduism, Buddhism and Christianity.

Principles and beliefs
The New Age practice of Huna emphasizes practical living and harmony with three levels of consciousness or selves. Long claimed that a low, middle, and higher self were recognized by the ancient kahunas.  Long called these selves the unihipili (subconscious, inner, emotional, intuitive), uhane (waking consciousness, rational) and aumakua (super-conscious, connection with the divine), however these are not the  Hawaiian meanings of these words. Long also redefined the Hawaiian concept of mana, (privileged as a divine power in traditional Hawaiian belief), and presented it instead as a vitalizing life force, which can, with knowledge of the three selves, be used in a manner of "personal empowerment" to heal body and mind and achieve life goals.

Long believed he had discovered an ancient Truth, not just about Hawaiian spirituality but linking back to India and ancient Egypt. He believed Hawaiians were a lost tribe of Berbers. He wrote that spiritual adepts migrated to Hawai‘i from Egypt, passing on to the priests of India some of their basic beliefs.

Long linked Huna to Theosophy and New Thought movements of the time. He wrote that the Christian Scientists understood positive thinking better than any group he knew, and encouraged his readers to subscribe to Unity Church’s magazine, Daily Word. Later Huna teachers have placed it firmly in the New Age, with Serge King claiming that Huna came originally from aliens from the Pleiades who were remnants of the mythical advanced civilizations of Mu or Lemuria, and Pila Chiles associating the islands with the New Age versions/interpretations of chakras, vortexes and ley lines.

According to critics, Serge King misappropriated and attempted to redefine three Hawaiian language words for his idea of "the three selves": "Ku," "Lono," and "Kane." However, the meanings he gives these words are not the meanings of the words in Hawaiian. King wrote that the seven principles of Huna are:

 IKE (ee-kay) – The world is what you think it is.
 KALA – There are no limits.
 MAKIA (mah-kee-ah) – Energy flows where attention goes.
 MANAWA (man-ah-wah) – Now is the moment of power.
 ALOHA – To love is to be happy with (someone or something).
 MANA – All power comes from within.
 PONO – Effectiveness is the measure of truth.

Native speakers, scholars and dictionaries concur that the meanings King gives for these words do not reflect their usage in the Hawaiian language, nor any traditional Hawaiian beliefs. King also calls what he does "shamanism" and cites "West African shamanism" as an influence.

Reaction
Max Freedom Long wrote that he obtained many of his case studies and his ideas about what to look for in kahuna magic from the Director of the Bishop Museum in Honolulu, William Brigham. According to an article in the peer-reviewed Hawaiian Journal of History, there is no credible evidence that the two men met (citation requested). Even if they did, Brigham was not an expert on kahunas and did not document in his own writings any of the incidents Long ascribed to him, including walking on hot lava. In his letters and manuscripts, Brigham stated that Hawaiians were "an inferior race," and implied they were lazy. He referred to Queen Lili'uokalani as a "she devil," "squaw," and "nigger."

Native Hawaiian scholar Charles Kenn, recognized in the Hawaiian community as a kahuna and expert in Hawaiian history and traditions, was friendly with Max Freedom Long but said, "While this Huna study is an interesting study, … it is not, and never was Hawaiian."

Pali Jae Lee, a research librarian at the Bishop Museum, and author of the classic book, Tales From the Night Rainbow, conducted extensive research on Max Freedom Long and Huna. She concluded, based on her interviews with Hawaiian elders, "Huna is not Hawaiian." Lee cites Theodore Kelsey, a Living Treasure of Hawai'i renowned for his work as a Hawaiian translator who wrote a letter to Long in 1936 (now in the Hawai'i State Archives) criticizing his use of the terms "unihipili" and "aumakua."

Author Nancy Kahalewai, a teacher of lomilomi massage, wrote that "traditional lomilomi practitioners do not teach this philosophy. In fact, most insist that it is not from the native Hawaiian culture at all."

Wells College Professor Lisa Kahaleole Hall, Ph.D., a Native Hawaiian, wrote in a peer-reviewed journal published by the University of Hawai'i that Huna "bears absolutely no resemblance to any Hawaiian worldview or spiritual practice" and calls it part of the "New Age spiritual industry."

Mikael Rothstein, an associate professor of religious history at the University of Copenhagen in Denmark, is the author of several books on religious history and new religious movements. He wrote about Huna in a peer-reviewed anthology:
Rather than integrating Hawaiian religion, however, New Agers seem to carry out a radical reinterpretation of this tradition, or simply invent traditions that were never Hawaiian. ... New Age representations redefine Hawaiian concepts in order to align them to basic New Age trends.
Rothstein also gathered opinions and analysis of Huna by native Hawaiians:
According to leading figures on the native-political scene in Hawaii, this kind of New Age representation amounts to straightforward exploitation. People often feel that non-Hawaiians are violating native intellectual property rights and that the out-of-context use of Hawaii’s religious legacy cripples the values that are imbedded in concepts such as kahuna, hula, Lomi Lomi, etc. The very idea that anyone could join a workshop and develop kahuna skills within a few weeks, for instance, is considered ridiculous as the traditional kahuna’s knowledge depends on a way of life rather than learning. ... By importing Hawaiian ethnicity and revivifying what is perceived to be Hawaii’s religious legacy, New Agers from Europe and the United States...do not need the Hawaiians themselves. They need a myth about them, and so they create it... 

Chai writes that Huna books are "examples of cultural appropriation."

According to the standard Pukui and Elbert Hawaiian dictionary, 'unihipili are the spirits of deceased persons, 'uhane is a soul, spirit or ghost, and 'aumakua are family or personal gods, deified ancestors who might assume the shape of animals. Kū, Lono and Kāne are Hawaiian gods.

In the Hawaiian language, the term kahuna is used for any expert. Kahuna include experts in diagnosing illness, herbal medicine, canoe building, temple building, wood carving, star-gazing, agriculture, and others.

Organizations
Huna Research Inc was founded by Long in 1945. On his death in 1971, he was succeeded as its head by Dr. E Otha Wingo (in accordance with a request by Long), and moved its headquarters to Missouri, where Wingo was a professor. It has fellowships in Canada, Australia, England, Germany and Switzerland, in addition to the United States.

Huna International was formed as a religious order in 1973 by King. It has three branches: Aloha International, Voices of the Earth and Finding Each Other International.

See also
 Declaration on the Rights of Indigenous Peoples
 Divine Science
 Ho'oponopono
 Marlo Morgan
 Plastic shaman
 Religious Science
 Seicho-No-Ie

Notes

References
 
  Republished as

Further reading
 
 
 
 
 
 
 
 
 
 
 
 
 

New Age
Spirituality
Religious organizations established in the 1930s
New Age practices
Spiritual practice
Cultural appropriation
Religious belief systems founded in the United States